Cerodirphia is a genus of moths in the family Saturniidae first described by Charles Duncan Michener in 1949.

Species
The genus includes the following species:

Cerodirphia apunctata Dias & Lemaire, 1991
Cerodirphia araguensis Lemaire, 1971
Cerodirphia avenata (Draudt, 1930)
Cerodirphia bahiana Lemaire, 2002
Cerodirphia barbuti Rougerie & Herbin, 2004
Cerodirphia brunnea (Draudt, 1930)
Cerodirphia candida Lemaire, 1969
Cerodirphia cutteri (Schaus, 1927)
Cerodirphia flammans Lemaire, 1973
Cerodirphia flavoscripta (Dognin, 1901)
Cerodirphia flavosignata (F. Johnson & Michener, 1948)
Cerodirphia gualaceensis Lemaire, 2002
Cerodirphia harrisae Lemaire, 1975
Cerodirphia inopinata Lemaire, 1982
Cerodirphia lojensis Lemaire, 1988
Cerodirphia marahuaca Lemaire, 1971
Cerodirphia mielkei Lemaire, 2002
Cerodirphia mota (Druce, 1911)
Cerodirphia nadiana Lemaire, 1975
Cerodirphia ockendeni Lemaire, 1985
Cerodirphia opis (Schaus, 1892)
Cerodirphia peigleri Naumann, Brosch & Wenczel, 2005
Cerodirphia porioni Lemaire, 1982
Cerodirphia radama (Druce, 1904)
Cerodirphia rosacordis (Walker, 1855)
Cerodirphia rubripes (Draudt, 1930)
Cerodirphia sanctimartinensis Lemaire, 1982
Cerodirphia speciosa (Cramer, 1777)
Cerodirphia vagans (Walker, 1855)
Cerodirphia wellingi Lemaire, 1973
Cerodirphia zikani (Schaus, 1921)

References

Hemileucinae